A list of chancellors of Queen's University Belfast and its predecessor Queen's College, Belfast.

List

See also
List of vice-chancellors of Queen's University Belfast
Chancellors of the Royal University of Ireland

References

 
Queens
Queens
Chancellors of Queen's University
Queens